Police Story 2013 (also known as Police Story: Lockdown) is a 2013 Chinese-Hong Kong action crime thriller film directed and written by Ding Sheng, and starring Jackie Chan in another reboot of the Police Story film series. The film is directed by Ding Sheng, who previously helmed Chan's Little Big Soldier. Unlike the previous Police Story films where he portrays a Hong Kong cop, Chan instead portrays a mainland Chinese officer.

Like New Police Story, 2013 is a stand-alone installment with a darker tone than the previous installments, which were more comedic. It is the sixth and most recent installment of the series.

Plot
Detective Zhong Wen heads to Wu Bar in search of his estranged daughter, Miao Miao, who is now the girlfriend of the nightclub's owner, Wu Jiang. However, Zhong disapproves of Miao's relationship, which leads to an argument between the father and daughter. Before Zhong can make amends with Miao, he is struck in the head by an unnamed assailant, in a plot orchestrated by Wu. Regaining consciousness, Zhong finds himself strapped onto a chair, and his hands bound by metal wires. He deduces that Wu was after him all along, but cannot conclude. Zhong also learns that the other bar patrons, including his daughter are being held captive. 

Wu phones the local Lieutenant and demands a hefty ransom as well as an audience with prisoner Wei Xiaofu, before leaving the room Zhong is trapped in. Zhong breaks free of the wires and escapes from the room. Scouring the bar undetected, he finds Wu's secret chamber, which is predominantly filled with posters of a teenage girl and a younger Wu, who once went by the moniker "Spider" when he was a kickboxer. He also spots blueprints of the bar and discerns that Wu intends to bomb the entire bar should his kidnapping ploy fail. Through Miao, Zhong obtains a cell phone, which he uses to contact the lieutenant. 

Wu soon discovers that Zhong has fled the hostage room. Wu grabs Miao and threaten to dip her hand in a fish tank full of piranhas, forcing Zhong to reveal his hiding place. Recaptured, Zhong offers an impatient Wu his assistance in finding Wei, who has yet to arrive. Wu agrees and gives Zhong two options — defeat one of his henchmen in a battle and be allowed to free three hostages, or admit defeat and find Wei alone. Zhong relents, agreeing to fight. With perseverance, and somehow unbreaking his broken finger, Zhong emerges as victor. Zhong then convinces a reluctant Wei Xiaofu to enter the bar with him. 

Back in Wu Bar, Wu Jiang reveals the reason behind the kidnapping: he intends to exact revenge on Zhong, Wei, and three other hostages, all of whom were coincidentally witnesses to Wu's younger sister's death. On that fateful day, Wei had wanted to steal medicine for his mother at a pharmacy. Wu's sister was also at the drug store. When Wei's theft is discovered, he panics and holds Wu's sister at knifepoint. It transpires that she had been pregnant and, due to stress, had committed suicide by slashing her own neck with Wei's weapon. Zhong, who was driving back home, happened to pass by the crime scene, but could not save her. 

Suddenly, a worker of Wu (the bartender) reveals himself to be Wu's sister's boyfriend. He reveals that he was trying to get through the crowd of police, but fails, and watches his girlfriend die. The bartender tries to shoot himself, but Zhong stops him and holds on to his arm. As Wu digests the truth, police forces storm into the bar. The bombs set in place by Wu go off and very few criminals flee through an underground escape route. The rest are gunned down. In the ensuing confusion, Wu leaves with Miao. Zhong gives chase and the trio end up in a subway tunnel. Wu offers Zhong an ultimatum: shoot himself and his daughter lives, or shoot Wu and his knife will slice Miao's neck and she will die. 

Zhong chooses the former but realises after pulling the trigger that the gun is unloaded. Wu informs Zhong that he has passed his test and in doing so, has earned his respect. Wu returns Miao to Zhong and prepares to let an oncoming train hit him. Zhong tries to stop him, but gets shot and is unable to stop his suicidal act in time but luckily, the train switches tracks just as it is about to collide with Wu. It is then revealed that the lieutenant changed the tracks. Wu is apprehended, while Zhong is sent to the hospital to heal his wounds. Zhong reconciles with his daughter in the ambulance and the SWAT captain hands him a spider medallion as a parting gift from Wu.

Cast

Jackie Chan as Detective Zhong Wen
Liu Ye as Wu Jiang
Jing Tian as Miao Miao
Yin Tao as Lan Lan
Liu Yiwei as Chief Niu
Zhou Xiaoou as Wei Xiaofu
Yu Rongguang as Captain Wu
Zhang Lei as Quanzi
Liu Peiqi as Chief Zhang
Wang Zhifei as Officer Fang
Zhang Xiaoning as Wu's father
 Zha Ka (aka Han Feixing) as Bin Ge
Guli Nazha as Xiao Wei
Wu Yue as Yue
Liu Hailong as Pizhong
Na Wei as Na Na
Cai An as Kun
Ding Sheng as truck driver

Production
Filming of Police Story 2013 began in November 2012 in Beijing. To prepare for his role, Chan cut his hair short to fit the look of a mainland officer. About his new role, Chan posted on his Sina Weibo account saying:

Filming wrapped on in February 2013 and post-production began, with the actors re-recording their dialogue.

Release
A public screening of Police Story 2013 was held at the 2013 Beijing International Film Festival in April. Chan also promoted the film at the 2013 Cannes Film Festival in May. The film was released in China on December 24 the same year.

The film was distributed as Police Story: Lockdown in the United States by Well Go USA Entertainment and released in June 2015.

Reception
Initial response for 2013 were generally mixed. Review aggregation website Rotten Tomatoes gives the film a score of 14% based on 7 reviews. It has a 44% rating on Metacritic, indicating "mixed or average reviews".

See also
Jackie Chan filmography
List of Hong Kong films

References

External links
 
 
 
 
 

2013 films
2013 action thriller films
2013 crime thriller films
Chinese action thriller films
Chinese crime thriller films
Remakes of Hong Kong films
Films directed by Ding Sheng
Films set in Beijing
Hong Kong action thriller films
Hong Kong crime thriller films
Police detective films
Police Story (film series)
Reboot films
2010s police procedural films
2010s Mandarin-language films
2010s Hong Kong films